Pavle Strugar (13 July 1933 – 12 December 2018) was a Montenegrin general in the Yugoslav People's Army (JNA) who was found guilty of war crimes for his role in the siege of Dubrovnik.

Biography 
Strugar was born in Peć, Kingdom of Yugoslavia. In October 1991, he was made commander of the JNA's Second Operational Group which operated in southern Croatia. In this role, he commanded the JNA's forces which laid siege to Dubrovnik, including its historic Old Town. The siege lasted until May 1992. Strugar retired in 1993.

In 2001, the International Tribunal for the Former Yugoslavia (ICTY) charged Strugar on several counts. These included violations of the customs of war and attacks on the UNESCO heritage site of the Old Town. Strugar voluntarily surrendered to the court, becoming the first Serbian or Montenegrin citizen to do so. He was found guilty of attacks on civilians as well as being responsible for damage to the Old Town. Strugar initially appealed his sentence, but later withdrew the appeal citing poor health.

In exchange, the court withdrew appeals of its own against Strugar. He was sentenced to eight years in jail. On 17 July 2008, his sentence was reduced to seven and one half years imprisonment on compassionate grounds due to his deteriorating health. On 16 January 2009, the ICTY granted Strugar early release.

He died in Belgrade on 12 December 2018 at the age of 85.

Notes

1933 births
2018 deaths
Military personnel from Peja
Montenegrin soldiers
Serbian soldiers
Generals of the Yugoslav People's Army
People convicted by the International Criminal Tribunal for the former Yugoslavia
Montenegrin people convicted of war crimes
Montenegrin generals
Military personnel of the Croatian War of Independence